The 1992 United Kingdom general election in Wales took place on 9 April 1992 for all 38 seats in Wales. The Labour Party again won a decisive majority of Welsh MPs, gaining three seats for a total of 27 out of 38. The Conservatives lost two Welsh MPs, Plaid Cymru gained one and the Liberal Democrats lost two of their three Welsh MPs. 

Despite the Labour party winning the most votes in Wales, the Conservatives won across the UK.

However, due to strong Conservative results in England and Scotland, the Conservative result in Wales was enough to allow the party to form a majority government for a fourth term.

Results
Below is a table summarising the results of the 1992 general election in Wales.

References

1992 in Wales
1990s elections in Wales
1992
Wales